James Mikell "Mike" Burns (born June 9, 1952) is an American politician. He is a member of the South Carolina House of Representatives from the 17th District, serving since 2013. He is a member of the Republican party.

Burns is a member of the South Carolina Freedom Caucus. He also serves on the House Agriculture, Natural Resources & Environmental Affairs and the Regulations and Administrative Procedures Committees.

On December 13, 2017, Burns and fellow South Carolina representative Bill Chumley proposed building a monument to South Carolina's black Confederate soldiers, although the historical record shows that no such soldiers existed.

In 2023, Burns was one of 21 Republican co-sponsors of the South Carolina Prenatal Equal Protection Act of 2023, which would make women who had abortions eligible for the death penalty.

References

Living people
1952 births
Republican Party members of the South Carolina House of Representatives
21st-century American politicians